Vladimir Petrovich Torchilin (born 1946) is a Soviet, Russian and American biochemist, pharmacologist , and an expert in medical nanotechnology. Torchillin is a University Distinguished Professor of Pharmaceutical Sciences at Northeastern University. He also serves as a Director at both the Center for Translational Cancer Nanomedicine and at the Center for Pharmaceutical Biotechnology and Nanomedicine at Northeastern University.

Torchillin researches topics like liposomes, lipid-core micelles, biomedical polymers, drug delivery and targeting, pharmaceutical nanocarriers and experimental cancer immunology.

Education
Torchilin was awarded a Master of Science in Polymer Chemistry from Moscow State University in 1968. In 1971 and 1980, he went on to receive his Doctor of Philosophy (Ph.D.) and Doctor of Science in Polymer Chemistry and Chemistry of Physiologically Active Compounds, respectively.

Career
In 1991, Torchillin became the head of the Chemistry Program, Center for Imaging and Pharmaceutical Research, and associate professor of radiology at Massachusetts General Hospital and Harvard University. From 1998 to 2008, he served as the Chair of the Department of Pharmaceutical Sciences at Northeastern University. In 2012, Torchillin became a Distinguished Professor at Northeastern University.

Awards and honors
1982 Lenin Prize in Science and Technology, for theoretical, experimental and clinical substantiation of the use of immobilized enzymes for the treatment of cardiovascular diseases.
2005 Research Achievements in Pharmaceutics and Drug Delivery Award from the AAPS
2007 Research Achievements Award from the Pharmaceutical Sciences World Congress
2009 International Journal of Nanomedicine Distinguished Scientist Award
2010 Founders Award, Controlled Release Society
2012 Alec Bangham Life Achievement Award
2013 Journal of Drug Targeting Life Achievement Award
2013 Blaise Pascal Medal in Biomedicine from the European Academy of Sciences

Fellowships
2002 Fellow of the American Institute of Medical and Biological Engineering
2003 Member of the European Academy of Science
2003 Fellow, American Association of Pharmaceutical Scientists (AAPS)
2010 Fellow, Controlled Release Society

Prose
In addition to his scientific work, Torchilin publishes essays and short stories in Russian and American magazines and newspapers.

Bibliography
In 2021, Torchilin was acknowledged as the top-cited researcher, amongst 131,000 researchers, in the Pharmacology & Pharmacy, Clinical Medicine Category, according Elsevier.com. Torchilin has published over 400 papers, 150 reviews and written and edited 10 books. 

 

Torchilin has published the following short stories for children:
1995: Странные рассказы, Moscow (short stories)
1996: Повезло, New York (short stories)
2000: Время между, St. Petersburg, Пушкинский Фонд (Pushkin Foundation), . (short stories and essays)
2006 Кружок друзей Автандила, Moscow, Наука-Культура (hard cover; novels, short stories)
 

The following is a series of academic handbooks by Torchilin, published at Jenny Stanford Publishing, on biomedical nanotechnology:

References

1946 births
Living people
American male writers
Russian biochemists
American biochemists
Lenin Prize winners
Northeastern University faculty
Harvard Medical School faculty
Moscow State University alumni
Fellows of the American Institute for Medical and Biological Engineering